Pedro Edmundo Warnke Bravo (born 3 July 1951) is a Chilean long-distance runner. He competed in the 5000 metres at the 1972 Summer Olympics and the 1976 Summer Olympics. Warnie finished fourth in the 5,000 metres at the 1971 Pan American Games and sixth in the 5,000 and 10,000 metres in the 1975 Pan American Games. In the 1979 Pan American Games, he finished fifth in the marathon.

References

1951 births
Living people
Athletes (track and field) at the 1972 Summer Olympics
Athletes (track and field) at the 1976 Summer Olympics
Chilean male long-distance runners
Olympic athletes of Chile
Athletes (track and field) at the 1971 Pan American Games
Athletes (track and field) at the 1975 Pan American Games
Athletes (track and field) at the 1979 Pan American Games
Pan American Games competitors for Chile
Sportspeople from Viña del Mar